The flat-tail mullet (Gracimugil argenteus) is a species of grey mullet from the family Mugilidae. It is endemic to southern Australia where it forms schools in shallows, and lower estuaries, as well as in more saline lagoons. It spawns at sea but juveniles move into freshwater until they are a year old. It feeds on benthic microorganisms such as crustaceans and filamentous algae. It is caught as a food fish. It is the only species in the monospecific genus Gracimugil.

References

Mugilidae
Taxa named by Jean René Constant Quoy
Taxa named by Joseph Paul Gaimard
Fish described in 1825